Lars-Olof Höök (born 1 March 1945) is a former Swedish long jumper who held the Swedish record from 1968 to 1978 and won seven consecutive national titles in 1963–1969. He placed 14th
at the 1968 Summer Olympics.

References

1945 births
Swedish male long jumpers
Olympic athletes of Sweden
Athletes (track and field) at the 1968 Summer Olympics
Living people
20th-century Swedish people